Tietjens is a surname. Notable people with the surname include:

 Doug Tietjens (born 1984), New Zealand rugby player 
 Edwin Tietjens (1894–1944), German psychiatrist
 Eunice Tietjens (1884–1944), American writer
 Gordon Tietjens (born 1955), New Zealand rugby coach 
 Jim Tietjens (born 1960), American soccer player
 Paul Tietjens (1877–1943), American composer
 Thérèse Tietjens (1831–1877), German soprano

See also
 Tietjen